is a railway station operated by East Japan Railway Company (JR East) in Tsurumi-ku, Yokohama, Kanagawa Prefecture, Japan.

Lines

Station layout
Kokudō Station has two opposed side platforms serving two tracks.

Platforms

History
Kokudō Station was opened on 28 October 1930 as a station on the privately held  for passenger operations only. The Tsurumi Rinkō line was nationalized on 1 July 1943, at which time the stop was elevated into status to that of a full station. The station was later absorbed into the Japan National Railways (JNR) network. In 1949, the station was used as a location setting for the Akira Kurosawa movie Stray Dog. The station has been unstaffed since 1 March 1971. Upon the privatization of the JNR on 1 April 1987 the station has been operated by JR East.

References
 Harris, Ken and Clarke, Jackie. Jane's World Railways 2008-2009. Jane's Information Group (2008).

External links

 JR East Kokudō Station